This is a list of the Libya national football team results from 1953 until 1999.

1953

1957

1964

1965

1966

1967

1969

1971

1973

1974

1975

1976

1977

1978

1979

1980

1981

1982

1983

1985

1988

1989

1991

1992

1997

1998

1999

Notes

External links

Wildstat

Results